Unión Deportiva Vecindario is a Spanish football team based in Vecindario, Santa Lucía de Tirajana, Gran Canaria, in the autonomous community of Canary Islands. Founded in 1962, it helds home games at Estadio Municipal de Vecindario, with a capacity of 4,500.

History
Unión Deportiva Vecindario was founded in 1962. After decades in the fourth division, it first reached the third exactly in the year 2000, being again relegated two years after.

In 2006–07 the club first appeared in the second level, but only lasted that season, ranking eventually last.

On 11 August 2015, the president of UD Vecindario announced the dissolution of the club.

On May 6, 2021, the return of the Unión Deportiva Vecindario to football is signed.

Season to season

1 season in Segunda División
10 seasons in Segunda División B
14 seasons in Tercera División

Former players

References

External links
Official website 
Futbolme team profile 
Unofficial website 

 
1962 establishments in the Canary Islands
2015 disestablishments in the Canary Islands
Association football clubs established in 1962
Association football clubs disestablished in 2015
Defunct football clubs in the Canary Islands
Sport in Gran Canaria
Segunda División clubs